Events in the year 1978 in Japan. It corresponds to Shōwa 53 (昭和53年) in the Japanese calendar.

Incumbents 
Emperor: Hirohito
Prime minister: Takeo Fukuda (Liberal Democratic) until December 7, Masayoshi Ōhira (Liberal Democratic)
Chief Cabinet Secretary: Shintaro Abe until December 7, Rokusuke Tanaka
Chief Justice of the Supreme Court: Masao Okahara
President of the House of Representatives: Shigeru Hori
President of the House of Councillors: Ken Yasui
Diet sessions: 84th (regular session opened in December 19, 1977, to June 16), 85th (extraordinary, September 18 to October 21), 86th (extraordinary, December 6 to December 12), 87th (regular, December 22 to June 14, 1979)

Governors
Aichi Prefecture: Yoshiaki Nakaya 
Akita Prefecture: Yūjirō Obata 
Aomori Prefecture: Shunkichi Takeuchi 
Chiba Prefecture: Kiichi Kawakami 
Ehime Prefecture: Haruki Shiraishi 
Fukui Prefecture: Heidayū Nakagawa 
Fukuoka Prefecture: Hikaru Kamei 
Fukushima Prefecture: Isao Matsudaira 
Gifu Prefecture: Yosuke Uematsu 
Gunma Prefecture: Ichiro Shimizu 
Hiroshima Prefecture: Hiroshi Miyazawa 
Hokkaido: Naohiro Dōgakinai 
Hyogo Prefecture: Tokitada Sakai
Ibaraki Prefecture: Fujio Takeuchi 
Ishikawa Prefecture: Yōichi Nakanishi 
Iwate Prefecture: Tadashi Chida 
Kagawa Prefecture: Tadao Maekawa 
Kagoshima Prefecture: Kaname Kamada 
Kanagawa Prefecture: Kazuji Nagasu 
Kochi Prefecture: Chikara Nakauchi  
Kumamoto Prefecture: Issei Sawada 
Kyoto Prefecture: Torazō Ninagawa (until 15 April); Yukio Hayashida (starting 15 April)
Mie Prefecture: Ryōzō Tagawa 
Miyagi Prefecture: Sōichirō Yamamoto 
Miyazaki Prefecture: Hiroshi Kuroki 
Nagano Prefecture: Gon'ichirō Nishizawa 
Nagasaki Prefecture: Kan'ichi Kubo 
Nara Prefecture: Ryozo Okuda 
Niigata Prefecture: Takeo Kimi 
Oita Prefecture: Masaru Taki 
Okayama Prefecture: Shiro Nagano 
Okinawa Prefecture: 
 until 23 November: Koichi Taira
 23 November-13 December: Takemori Nijima
 starting 13 December: Junji Nishime
Osaka Prefecture: Ryōichi Kuroda 
Saga Prefecture: Sunao Ikeda 
Saitama Prefecture: Yawara Hata 
Shiga Prefecture: Masayoshi Takemura 
Shiname Prefecture: Seiji Tsunematsu 
Shizuoka Prefecture: Keizaburō Yamamoto 
Tochigi Prefecture: Yuzuru Funada 
Tokushima Prefecture: Yasunobu Takeichi 
Tokyo: Ryōkichi Minobe 
Tottori Prefecture: Kōzō Hirabayashi 
Toyama Prefecture: Kokichi Nakada 
Wakayama Prefecture: Shirō Kariya  
Yamagata Prefecture: Seiichirō Itagaki 
Yamaguchi Prefecture: Toru Hirai 
Yamanashi Prefecture: Kunio Tanabe

Events
January 14 - According to Japan Fire and Disaster Management Agency confirmed report, total of 25 people were dead, 211 people were wounded, a Richer Scale 6.7 earthquake and aftershocks damaged in Izu Peninsula, Shizuoka Prefecture.
March 26 - Protesters destroy much of equipment in the control tower of Narita Airport with Molotov cocktails, set to open in just four days.
May 20, 1978 - Narita International Airport opened
June 12 - A large 7.7 magnitude earthquake hits offshore Miyagi Prefecture and causes 28 deaths and 1,325 injuries.
July 30, 1978 - Okinawa Prefecture changed driving on the Right-hand traffic to Left-hand traffic(730)
August 12 - The Treaty of Peace and Friendship between Japan and the People's Republic of China is concluded.
December 16 - The Mystery of Mamo is released in cinemas.

Births

January–June
January 2 – Toyoguchi Megumi, voice actress
January 6 –
Reina Miyauchi, J-pop singer 
Ayano Tsuji, J-pop singer
January 7 – Asami Imajuku, model, actress, and singer
January 9 – Hassei Takano, actor
January 10 – Kanako Mitsuhashi, voice actress
January 11 – Kyoko Hamaguchi, freestyle wrestler
January 15 – Vanilla Yamazaki, katsudō-benshi, voice actor, an actress
January 16 – Hisanori Ōiwa, actor, stunt performer and suit actor 
January 17
 Takatoshi Kaneko, actor 
 Hiro Suzuhira, manga artist
January 24 – Tomokazu Myojin, football midfielder
January 26 – Atsuko Kurusu, actress
January 27 – Akiko Hinagata, actress and former gravure idol.
February 4 – Shingo Kawaguchi, actor
February 20 – Ken Takeuchi, voice actor
February 21 – Miki Sakai, actress and J-pop idol singer
February 23 – Yuka Motohashi, actress
February 25
Yuji Nakazawa, football player
Shintarō Tokita, musician
February 28 – Rei Kikukawa, actress, model, and television presenter
March 1
Noriyasu Agematsu, composer
Sakura Nogawa, voice actress
March 8 – Genki Sudo, mixed martial artist and a kickboxer
March 9 – Ryosuke Sawai, baseball player
March 12 – Arina Tanemura, manga artist
March 15 – Takeru Kobayashi, competitive eater
March 18
Shimotori Norio, sumo wrestler 
Yoshie Takeshita, volleyball player
March 20 – Hanako Oku, singer
March 24
Takeharu Kato, baseball player
Kaori Mochida, singer
March 29 – Hirotoki Onozawa, rugby union player
April 5 – Yumie Funayama, curler
April 8 – Daigo, e singer-songwriter, actor, talent, and voice actor
April 9
Kousei Amano, actor 
Takashi Ōhara, voice actor
April 14 – Kaori Muraji, classical guitarist
April 18 – Ryōta Tsuzuki, football player
April 24 – Kazunari Okayama, football player
April 26
Hiroshi Asai, musician and composer
Shinnosuke Tachibana, voice actor
April 27 – Takahiro Suzuki, baseball player
May 1 – Sachie Hara, actress and model
May 3 – Dai Tamesue, hurdler athlete 
May 4 – Daisuke Ono, voice actor
May 8 – Atsushi Sato, long-distance runner
May 10 – Daisuke Yamai, basketball pitcher
May 11 – Ushiomaru Motoyasu, sumo wrestler (d. 2019)
October 2 – Ayumi Hamasaki, singer, songwriter, actress and model
May 12 – Masahiro Abe, baseball player
May 13 – Junji Majima, voice actor
May 15
Kōsei Inoue, Judoka
Hideki Sahara, football player
May 17 – Norihiro Yamagishi, football player
May 18 – Toru Yano, wrestler
May 23 – Hideaki Kitajima, football player
June 1 – Ayako Ikeda, singer-songwriter
June 2 – Junko Yaginuma, announcer and model
June 5
Yuka Inokuchi, voice actress
Takayuki Kondō, voice actor
Taro Suruga, musician
June 12 – Yumiko Shaku, actress and model
June 13 – Mikako Ichikawa, actress and model
June 17 – Kumiko Asō, actress
June 24 – Shunsuke Nakamura, football player
June 25 – Miki Nakao, backstroke swimmer

July –December

July 3 – Mizuki Noguchi, long-distance runner
July 4 – Yusuke Murata manga artist
July 7
Kayo Kitada, judoka
Misia, singer, songwriter, and record producer
July 9 – Osamu Hamanaka, baseball player
July 10 – Kotaro Koizumi, actor
July 12 – Yoshihito Ishii, baseball player
July 19 – Atsushi Harada, actor
July 21 – Kyoko Iwasaki, swimmer
July 22 – Kyōko Hasegawa, actress and model
July 23 – Takashi Yamamoto, swimmer
July 24 – Sayo Aizawa, model
July 28 – Hitomi Yaida, pop/folk rock singer-songwriter and guitarist
August 4 – Satoshi Hino, voice actor
August 8
Natsuko Kuwatani, voice actress
Miho Shiraishi, actress
August 12 
Toru Kurihara, rugby union player
Kakizoe Tōru, sumo wrestler
August 24 – Kentaro Sekimoto, baseball player
September 6
Homare Sawa, football player
Keigo Yamashita, Go player
September 18 – Kaoru Mori, manga artist
October 2 – Ayumi Hamasaki, recording artist, actress, model, and entrepreneur
October 18
Kotomi Kyono, actress
Minoru Shiraishi, voice actor
October 20 – Nora Hirano, comedian
October 21 – Mariko Ooe, newsroom announcer
October 25 – Maria Takagi, actress
October 27 – Manami Konishi, rapper, songwriter, record producer, and actress
October 31 – Mika Sugisaki, announcer, radio personality, entertainer, and actress
November 3 – Koshiro Take, jockey
November 4 – Akiko Abe, announcer and actress
November 7 – Tomoya Nagase, singer and actor
November 8 – Kensaku Kishida, actor
November 10 – Akemi Kanda, voice actress
November 25
Ayumi Ogasawara, curler
Ringo Sheena,  singer, songwriter and musician
November 26 – Fukuyama Jun voice actor
November 28 – Tomohiro Nagatsuka cyclist
December 5 – Michinao Yamamura, baseball player
December 7 – Yasue Sato, actress and model
December 9 – Chihiro Kusaka, voice actress
December 12 – Hiroki Konno, comedian
December 23 – Akiko Yada, actress
December 25 – Miyuki Takahashi, volleyball player
December 26 – Kaoru Sugayama, volleyball player
December 29 – Noriko Aoyama, actress and former model

Deaths
January 5 – Shōji Hamada, potter (b. 1894)
March 1 – Kiyoshi Oka, mathematician (b. 1901)
March 5 – Toshiko Higashikuni, daughter of Emperor Meiji (b. 1896)
April 29 – Yukihiko Yasuda, painter (b. 1884)
May 15 – Kiku Amino,  author and translator (b. 1900)
May 30 – Tetsu Katayama, politician and 33rd Prime Minister of Japan (b. 1887)
June 6 – Katué Kitasono, poet and photographer (b. 1902)
July 10 – Takashi Suzuki, politician (b. 1882)
July 25 – Masao Koga, composer (b. 1904)
August 1 – Kōgorō Uemura, businessman (b. 1892)
September 9 – Kaoru Abe, saxophonist (b. 1949)

See also
 1978 in Japanese television
 List of Japanese films of 1978

References

 
Years of the 20th century in Japan
Japan
1970s in Japan